The Boston College Club Hockey program is a student-run, sports club at Boston College (BC). The team is called the Boston College Eagles.

The program is partially funded by BC, the remainder raised by fundraising efforts and player dues. The Eagles have had the same coach since 2008. Seasons consist of approximately 25 to 30 games, depending on whether the Eagles qualify for the league playoffs and national tournament.

History
In 2008, the BC Program was founded by students who wanted to play competitive hockey between the intramural and varsity levels.

In 2009, the BC Program joined the  American Collegiate Hockey Association (ACHA).  The Eagles reached the national tournament in its first year of eligibility, finishing number six in the league.  In 2010, the Eagles finished number five.  The Eagles beat Northeastern University in the 2011 Club Hockey Beanpot.

2012-2013 Season
In 2012-2013, the Eagles started the season with 1-6-1 record, then rebounded to finish went 15-9-3.  The Eagles failed to reach the National tournament, after losing to the University of Connecticut in the second game of the ACHA Division II Northeast playoffs.

References 

Boston College Eagles ice hockey
Ice hockey in Boston
2008 establishments in Massachusetts
Ice hockey clubs established in 2008